Abcho (typeset as ABCHO, meaning Abstract Chop), is a Japanese pop unit made up of two members from Japanese pop groups Morning Musume, their subgroup which includes Older/Graduated Members, Dream Morning Musume, and J-Pop Metal Group Hangry & Angry: Hitomi Yoshizawa and Rika Ishikawa. They formed in middle of February 2012, and released their first single on May 23, 2012.

Members

History

2008: Before Abcho
Hitomi Yoshizawa and Rika Ishikawa were in another duo called Hangry & Angry.

2012-present: Formation and debut single
In February 2012, Hitomi Yoshizawa and Rika Ishikawa announced that would form a new unit called Abcho. Abcho's first single was released on May 23, 2012. This was used as the opening theme song for Sengoku Collection.

Discography

Singles

References

External links
  

Japanese girl groups
Musical groups established in 2012
Japanese pop music groups
Universal Music Japan artists
2012 establishments in Japan
Musical groups from Tokyo
Japanese musical duos
Pop music duos